Deadman or Deadman's may refer to: 

 "Deadman" or "dead man", are alternative terms for a dead man's switch
 "Deadman's foot" is another name for a Salamander in metallurgy
 "Deadman anchor" is a buried object (log, concrete, block, etc.) used to anchor objects during construction, mooring, or other activities.
 Deadman (climbing), an anchor used in Alpine mountaineering, such as a snow fluke

Places 
 Deadman's Cay, Bahamas
 Deadman's Cay Airport, an airport on the aforementioned cay
 Deadman's Curve, a 1978 American made-for-television biographical film
 Deadman Islands
 Deadman's Island (disambiguation), a number of places of the same name
 Deadman's Island, Halifax
 Deadman's Island (San Pedro)
 Deadman's Island (Vancouver)
 Deadman SSSI, Somerset
 Deadman Summit, California
 Deadman River, British Columbia

People 
 Derek Deadman (1940–2014), English actor 
 The Undertaker (born 1965), professional wrestler, also known as The Deadman

Media 
 Deadman (comics), a DC Comics character
 Deadman (band), a Japanese alternative rock band
 "Deadman", a song by Australian progressive rock band Karnivool
 Deadman (Vertigo), a 2006 comic series loosely based on the character
 Deadman (album), an EP by House of Brothers
"Deadman", a 1972 performance piece by Chris Burden

See also
 Dead man (disambiguation)